The Undowah River, a perennial river of the Snowy River catchment, is located in the Monaro region of New South Wales, Australia.

Course and features
The Undowah River rises on the southern slopes of Thoko Hill, near the locality of Bellevue, southwest of Bemboka. The river flows generally south by west, joined by one minor tributary before reaching its confluence with the Bombala River near the village of Bibbenluke, northeast of Bombala. The river descends  over its  course.

See also

 Rivers of New South Wales
 List of rivers of New South Wales (L-Z)
 List of rivers of Australia

References

Rivers of New South Wales